Northcliffe is a neighborhood in unincorporated northwest Harris County, Texas, United States. 

It is located near Richey Road and Veterans Memorial Drive. It is north of Northcliffe Manor, southeast of Willowbrook, and west of Kleinbrook. The subdivision is located three miles from the Houston city limits and it has a Houston mailing address.

Police service
The neighborhood is within the Harris County Sheriff's Office jurisdiction.

Education
Most students living in Northcliffe Manor are zoned to the Klein Independent School District.

Schools include:
Klein Forest High School 
Wunderlich Intermediate School
Kaiser Elementary

References

Unincorporated communities in Harris County, Texas
Unincorporated communities in Texas